Krabisuchus is an extinct genus of alligatoroid crocodylian that existed in what is now Thailand during the Eocene. It was first named by paleontologists Jeremy A. Martin and Komsorn Lauprasert in 2010, and the type species is K. siamogallicus. Fossils have been found from the Krabi Basin of southern Thailand and include mostly cranial and mandibular elements as well as some postcranial remains. Krabisuchus is currently the most well known primitive alligatoroid from Asia; previously, these animals were only represented in Asia by a few fragmentary remains from China. The fossil record of alligatoroids is much more extensive in Europe and North America, where most taxa have been described.

Description
Like the alligator, it had a blunt snout. Krabisuchus also had a raised skull similar to the extinct alligatorine Arambourgia and living crocodile Osteolaemus tetraspis. The teeth at the back of the jaws were very blunt. It, like other extinct alligatoroids, was probably terrestrial rather than semiaquatic. This terrestrial lifestyle may have allowed other alligatoroids to colonize much of the northern hemisphere during the Paleogene when global temperatures were much warmer than they are today.

Classification
Krabisuchus was originally classified as a member of Alligatorinae. However, a 2019 study by Massonne et al. included additional taxa from Asia and found that the group of extinct Asian alligatoroids together formed a clade, named Orientalosuchina, as basal members of Alligatoroidea, as shown in the cladogram below:

References

Crocodilians
Eocene crocodylomorphs
Eocene reptiles of Asia
Fossil taxa described in 2010
Prehistoric pseudosuchian genera